Mamay may refer to:

 Mamay (film), 2003, Ukrainian 

See also:
 Mamai (fl. c. 1370), East-European soldier and ruler
 Cossack Mamay, legendary character in Ukrainian folklore